Orange Municipal Airport,  in Orange, Massachusetts, is a public airport owned by Town of Orange.  It has two runways, averages 137 flights per day, and has approximately 52 aircraft based on its field.

Flight training and parachuting services are available.

References

External links 
 Orange Municipal Airport

Airports in Massachusetts
Transportation buildings and structures in Franklin County, Massachusetts